"Saoko" (Puerto Rican slang for "outstanding rhythm" stylized in all caps) is a song by Spanish singer-songwriter Rosalía. It was released on 4 February 2022 through Columbia Records, as the second single from her third studio album Motomami (2022). The song was written by Rosalía, David Rodríguez, el Kagueto del Guetto, Juan Orengo, Justin Quiles, Michael Uzowuru, Noah Goldstein and Urbani Cedeño. Rosalía, Wiggins, Goldstein, and Uzowuru also served as producers. With lyrics about transformation and metamorphosis, Rosalía's "Saoko" contains an interpolation of "Saoco" by Wisin and Daddy Yankee. 

The song was widely acclaimed by music critics, most of whom praised its deconstruction of reggaeton and cyberpunk experimental sounds, stating "the song is more experimental than anything she has recorded before and perhaps her best work yet". The song's accompanying music video, directed by Valentin Petit, was shot in Kyiv, mainly at Podilskyi Bridge. It would go on to win an MTV Video Music Award and a UK Music Video Award.

Background
"Saoko" was first mentioned in November 2021, in a Rolling Stone article by Diego Ortiz that covered the emancipation of Rosalía and the recording process of her album Motomami. It was also revealed to be the opening track of the album. The singer previewed the song on TikTok on 29 December.

Upon unveiling the cover art of the album, the singer announced a new song to be released on 4 February. A teaser of the music video for "Saoko" was posted on 2 February, indicating the release of the song that week.

This song is set to be used on FIFA 23's soundtrack, which was released on 30 September 2022.  Due to players that pre-ordered the game via Xbox getting access to the game earlier than the official release date accidentally, the entire soundtrack has been leaked early to the game's release, confirming "Saoko" being part of it.

Composition
"Saoko" is an experimental track "as fun as driving a Lamborghini", with industrial and reggaeton elements that runs for two minutes and seventeen seconds. It features heavy synthesizers, a distorted piano and traditional reggaeton drums, as well as a ten-second avant-jazz talking interlude between the singer and her team at Electric Lady that was compared to Eddie Palmieri's The Sun of Latin Music (1974). Described by music critics as "bizarre, industrial and psychotic", the song combines influences of Nine Inch Nails' The Downward Spiral (1994), and Kanye West's Yeezus (2013), both of which Rosalía has cited as an artistic inspiration, as well as Arca, who she previously worked with on "KLK". "Saoko" marks the first solo release of Rosalía since "Dolerme". 

In an interview with Clash, Rosalía explained that "each and every phrase is an image of transformation. Celebrating transformation, celebrating change. Celebrating that you are always yourself even though you are in constant transformation or even that you are you more than ever at the very moment you are changing". Lyrical references include Frank Ocean, Vivienne Westwood, Lego, and Kim Kardashian, among others.

Music video
Rosalía shared a preview of the music video on 2 February 2022. The video itself premiered on 4 February on YouTube. It was directed by Valentin Petit and produced by Division. It features an all-female professional motorcycle crew. It was filmed over the course of three days in early July 2021 mainly at the Podilskyi Bridge and Naberezhno-Khreschatytska street in Kyiv, Ukraine, as well as in a filming studio nearby. A fictional gas station was set up in the filming studio also using chroma key technique. The music video received comparisons to Spring Breakers, Street Fighter, Fallen Angels, and the music video for "Gasolina".

Style advice was given by Samantha Burkhart, featuring clothes by Jean Paul Gaultier.

For the video, Petit and co-editor Jon Echeveste would go on to win the MTV Video Music Award for Best Editing.

Personnel
Credits adapted from Tidal.

Production
 Rosalia Vila Tobella – composition, songwriting, production, vocal production, vocals, background vocals, handclaps, drums, piano.
 Noah Goldstein – composition, songwriting,  production, drums.
 Dylan Wiggins – composition, songwriting, production, piano.
 David Rodríguez – composition, songwriting, recording engineer.
 Justin Rafael Quiles – composition, songwriting
 Michael Uzowuru – composition, production, bass, synthesizer
 Juan Luis Morera – songwriting (sample)
 Urbani Mota Cedeño – songwriting
 Juan Ivan Orengo – songwriting

Technical
 Anthony Vilchis – assistant engineer
 Chris Gehringer – mastering engineer
 Manny Marroquin - mixing engineer
 Zach Peraya – assistant engineer
 Jeremie Inhaber – assistant engineer
 Anthony Vilchis – assistant engineer
 Chris Gehringer – assistant engineer

Charts

Certifications

Release history

References

2022 singles
2022 songs
Columbia Records singles
Rosalía songs
Songs written by Justin Quiles
Songs written by Michael Uzowuru
Songs written by Rosalía
Spanish-language songs
Music videos shot in Ukraine